The list of ship launches in 1875 includes a chronological list of some ships launched in 1875.


References

Sources

1875
Ship launches